Sebastián Marcelo Blanco (born 15 March 1988) is an Argentine professional footballer who currently plays for Major League Soccer side Portland Timbers.

Club career

Lanús
Blanco made his breakthrough into the Lanús first team in 2006. In 2007, he was part of the squad that won the 2007 Apertura championship, the first top flight league title in the club's history.

West Brom
On 30 August 2014, Blanco signed a two-year contract with the option of a third year with Premier League side West Bromwich Albion F.C..

San Lorenzo
Blanco signed with the Argentine team San Lorenzo de Almagro for the 2016–17 season and went on to play 853 minutes for the side.

Portland Timbers
On 2 February 2017 Blanco was transferred from San Lorenzo to the Portland Timbers of Major League Soccer. Blanco was signed as a Designated Player. On 11 September 2018, Blanco was named MLS Player of the Week for Week 28 of the 2018 season after scoring a brace in a 2–0 victory over the Colorado Rapids. On 10 October 2018, Blanco received a second Player of the Week award of the season after scoring two goals and an assist in Portland's 4–1 win over Real Salt Lake. Blanco signed a multi-year extension to his Designated Player contract on 29 October 2019. On 13 August 2020, Blanco was named MLS is Back Player of the Tournament for his contributions towards the Timbers' victory. On 16 May 2022, Blanco was awarded MLS Player of the Week for Week 11 of the 2022 season in recognition of his performance in a 7–2 win over Sporting Kansas City in which he notched two goals and two assists.

International career 

On 20 May 2009, Blanco made his debut for the Argentina national team in a friendly match against Panama, coming on as a second-half substitute.

Career statistics

International 
International goals
|-
| 1. || 5 May 2010 || Estadio Coloso del Ruca Quimey, Cutral Có, Argentina ||  || align=center|4–0 || align=center|4–0 || Friendly || 
|}

Honours 
Lanús
Argentine Primera División: 2007 Apertura

San Lorenzo
Supercopa Argentina: 2015

Portland Timbers
MLS is Back Tournament: 2020

Individual
MLS is Back Tournament Player of the Tournament: 2020

References

External links 
 Argentine Primera statistics at Fútbol XXI  
 Club Atlético Lanús profile 
 
 Unofficial website 

1988 births
Living people
People from Lomas de Zamora
Argentine footballers
Argentina international footballers
Argentine expatriate footballers
Association football midfielders
Club Atlético Lanús footballers
FC Metalist Kharkiv players
West Bromwich Albion F.C. players
San Lorenzo de Almagro footballers
Portland Timbers players
Argentine Primera División players
Ukrainian Premier League players
Premier League players
Major League Soccer players
Expatriate footballers in Ukraine
Expatriate footballers in England
Expatriate soccer players in the United States
Argentine expatriate sportspeople in Ukraine
Argentine expatriate sportspeople in England
Argentine expatriate sportspeople in the United States
Designated Players (MLS)
Sportspeople from Buenos Aires Province